Reid v. Covert, 354 U.S. 1 (1957), was a 6-to-2 landmark decision of the United States Supreme Court holding that United States citizen civilians outside of the territorial jurisdiction of the United States cannot be tried by a United States military tribunal, but instead retain the protections guaranteed by the United States Constitution, in this case, trial by jury. Additionally, a plurality of the Court also reaffirmed the president’s ability to enter into international executive agreements, though it held that such agreements cannot contradict federal law or the Constitution.

Background 
The case involved Clarice B. Covert, who had been convicted by a military tribunal of murdering her husband, a sergeant in the USAF, at an airbase in England. At the time of her alleged offense, an executive agreement was in effect between the United States and United Kingdom, which permitted US military courts to exercise exclusive jurisdiction over offenses by U.S. servicemen or their dependents.

The court initially ruled against Mrs. Covert, but changed its mind and issued a new decision in her favor after her lawyer, Frederick Bernays Wiener, famously made a successful petition for rehearing.  This is the only time the Supreme Court, without a relevant change in its membership, has changed its mind as the result of a petition for rehearing.

Opinion of the Court 
The Court found: "No agreement with a foreign nation can confer power on the Congress, or on any other branch of Government, which is free from the restraints of the Constitution."  The Court's core holding of the case is that U.S. citizen civilians abroad have the right to Fifth Amendment and Sixth Amendment constitutional protections.

The Court found it unconstitutional to adjudge U.S. citizen civilians in military courts, under the Uniform Code of Military Justice.

The Court agreed with the petitioners, concluding that as United States citizens they were entitled to the protections of the Bill of Rights, notwithstanding that they committed crimes on foreign soil. The Court distinguished Reid from the Insular Cases:
The "Insular Cases" can be distinguished from the present cases in that they involved the power of Congress to provide rules and
regulations to govern temporarily territories with wholly dissimilar traditions and institutions.

Justice Black declared: "The concept that the Bill of Rights and other constitutional protections against arbitrary government are inoperative when they become inconvenient or when expediency dictates otherwise is a very dangerous doctrine and if allowed to flourish would destroy the benefit of a written Constitution and undermine the basis of our government."

Justice Harlan's concurred with the judgment of the Court but disagreed with much of Justice Black's reasoning. He held that the court-martial per se was not unconstitutional, being an appropriate application of the Necessary and Proper Clause. Harlan also explicitly stated that this power was not limited by either Article III or the Fifth and Sixth Amendments.

Significance 

The significance of the case lies in the protection that the United States Constitution grants to civilians who are associated with the United States Armed Forces and are accused of crimes. Covert and its progeny cases made clear that civilians can't be tried by military courts, but instead must be tried in civil courts regardless where the crime was committed. "The Constitution does not allow Congress to pass regulations that allow the military to court-martial a civilian. To do so would deprive an individual of all the safeguards of the Constitution and Bill of Rights, as well as the protections of civil laws and protections. [...] Covert and its progeny unequivocally strike down military jurisdiction over civilian crimes of the United States. [...] From this point on, the Constitution was to be interpreted and ensuring that the Bill of Rights would protect all U.S. citizens accused of crimes no matter where those crimes occurred."

Aftermath
Clarice Covert could not be retried. She eventually moved to Flagstaff, Arizona where she worked in the advertising department of Arizona Sun newspaper and as an archaeologist at the Museum of Northern Arizona.
She died on May 9, 1992 in Flagstaff, Arizona.

See also 
 Botiller v. Dominguez (1889)
 Wilson v. Girard (1957)
 Kinsella v. Krueger (1957)
 United States ex rel. Toth v. Quarles (1955)
 List of United States Supreme Court cases, volume 354

References

Further reading

External links 
 
 

1957 in United States case law
United States Supreme Court cases
United States Supreme Court cases of the Warren Court
United States foreign relations case law